A residential airpark (also spelled air park) is also referred to as a "fly-in community". The word can also refer to a community specifically designed around an airport where the residents each would own their own airplane which they park in their hangar usually attached to the home or integrated into their home. The residential airpark or fly-in community features one or more runways with homes adjacent to the runway.  Many fly-in communities feature a variety of amenities, such as golf course, equestrian facilities and more. Residential airparks or fly-in communities are usually privately owned and restricted to use by the property owners and their invited guests. Most do not include commercial operations or businesses. The communities have also become a niche real estate market, with some firms dedicated solely to these developments.

Ideas for airparks existed as early as 1944. However, the first airpark was Sierra Sky Park in Fresno, California, established in 1946. The Living With Your Plane Association estimates that there are at least 426 residential airparks in the United States. Florida is estimated to have 52 airparks, followed by Washington with 50, California with 28, and Oregon with 23.

Some notable airparks

Canada
 Calgary/Okotoks Air Park (Calgary, Alberta)

South Africa
 Zandspruit Bush & Aero Estate (Hoedspruit, Limpopo)

United States
 Pegasus Airpark (Queen Creek, Arizona)
 Carmel Valley Airport (Carmel Valley, California)
 Cameron Airpark (Cameron Park, California)
 Sierra Sky Park Airport (Fresno, California)
 Pine Mountain Lake Airport (Groveland, California)
 Ridge Landing Airpark (Frostproof, Florida)
 Spruce Creek Airport (Port Orange, Florida)
 Greystone Airport / Jumbolair Aviation Estates (Ocala, Florida)
 Independence State Airport (Independence, Oregon)
 Big South Fork Airpark (Oneida, Tennessee)
 Frontier Airpark (Marysville, Washington)
 Alpine Airpark (Alpine, Wyoming)

See also
Aerodrome
Heliport
Highway strip
Joint-use airport
Naval outlying landing field
Non-towered airport
Pilot-controlled lighting
STOLport
List of shortest runways

References

Airports by type